Cajon Junction is an unincorporated community in Cajon Canyon and the northern Cajon Pass area, within San Bernardino County, California.

It is located at the intersection of California State Route 138 (Pearblossom Highway) and Interstate 15

And is north of Keenbrook, Cozy Dell and Icenbrook

Cajon Junction is a popular stop in the Cajon Pass there is a gas station and multiple fast food restaurants in the area.

References

Unincorporated communities in San Bernardino County, California
San Gabriel Mountains
Unincorporated communities in California